Bryan M. Ferguson (born 25 February 1987) is a Scottish filmmaker and music video director, best known for his music videos for artists such as Garbage, Alice Glass, Ladytron, Arab Strap and Boy Harsher.

Music videos 
After being recommended Ferguson's early short films, Helen Marnie of Ladytron head-hunted Ferguson to write and direct a short film to accompany the band's single "The Island". The short film was controversial for fans for its disturbing ending but supported by the band for its social commentary on humanity. The film would later be invited to screen at the Raindance Film Festival and Leeds International Film Festival in 2019. Ferguson would subsequently work with the band again for their song, "Deadzone". The video is notable for being inspired by J.G. Ballard's "Crash".

Following the release of Ladytron's "The Island", Ferguson would work with frequent collaborator Sega Bodega for the first time on his multidisciplinary EP project titled "self*care". Ferguson was one of the six filmmakers invited to create their own interpretations of 'self care' for the track "Hopeless!!!". Other notable artists invited to create films for the project were Brooke Candy and BEA1991. Ferguson would later direct music videos for Sega Bodega's singles, "U Suck" and "Make U Stay" featuring Låpsley.

On 11 December 2018 Ferguson's vampiric music video for Boy Harsher's "Fate" was released and was named one of The 20 best videos of 2018 by Filter Magazine.

After seeing his video for Boy Harsher, Lil Peep's producer, Fish Narc approached Ferguson in 2020 to direct the videos for both his singles, "So Long!", featuring Cold Hart and "New Medication" from the GothBoiClique released album, "Wildfire".

On 17 February 2021 Ferguson's controversial video for Arab Strap's single "Here Comes Comus!" was released. The video was deemed too explicit for YouTube by the band's label, Rock Action. The band's frontman, Aidan Moffat, revealed scenes of full frontal male nudity and excessive drug taking were omitted during an interview on Reddit.

On 2 December 2021 a video directed by Ferguson was released for Ross From Friends' single "Love Divide". The music video was released by Flying Lotus' label Brainfeeder and depicts a business man looking for his face inside an office building where everyone's head is on backwards.

On 8 December 2021 Ferguson's dramatic video for Alice Glass' "Fair Game" was premiered via Rolling Stone. The video depicts a young woman in a leather straitjacket breaking free of chains while being tormented by a ghostly Alice Glass. The track is written from the perspective of Glass' abuser based on her experiences while in the band Crystal Castles.  He would collaborate again with Alice Glass on the gory music video for "Love Is Violence". The early 2000's inspired video depicts two teenagers who sensually pull out each other's entrails.

On 1 September 2022 The Soft Moon released the single "Monster" accompanied with a provocative music video directed by Ferguson. The body-horror infused video depicts a man slowly transforming into a monstrous form.

On October 21, 2022, a "vampiric" music video for Garbage single, "Witness to Your Love" directed by Ferguson was teased. The video premiered on October 28, the day of Anthology release.

Short films 
In 2015 Ferguson won The Skinny Short Film Award for his no-budget Florida set film “Caustic Gulp”. He would gain notoriety within the Scottish short film circuit in 2016 with his follow up film, “Flamingo”. The mid-length film depicts two strangers and their fetish for self-amputation. The film caused multiple viewers to faint at the Centre for Contemporary Arts in Glasgow during its premiere at the Glasgow Short Film Festival.

In 2019, Ferguson released the short film, Satanic Panic '87. An 1980s set horror-comedy infusing death metal with a satanic aerobics tape. The film was made as part of Channel 4's Random Acts and subsequently broadcast during Halloween on Film4 as part of their FilmFear season. The Skinny called it "the kind of imaginative, outsider art that Channel 4 has been championing since its inception." Dazed called it "absolute carnage". In 2020 the film became  one of four films invited to represent Scottish short film for Short Circuit's Screening In Scotland Film Tour.  The film screened at notable festivals such as Show Me Shorts, Cork International Film Festival and Galway Film Fleadh. The film can be streamed on Gunpowder and Sky's horror channel Alter and Arrow Film's streaming platform, Arrow Player.

Ferguson released the short film, "Insecticide". A film he made during the first lockdown of 2020 as a response to the coronavirus pandemic. Ferguson made the film entirely within 72 hours with his wife, using only what they had in their apartment then soundtracked by Alex Mackay of Mogwai. The film would later be available on Arrow Film's streaming platform, Arrow Player.

On 6 July 2021 it was announced Ferguson had made a short film entitled "Red Room" based upon Helen McClory's gothic novel "Bitterhall". The film was commissioned by the Edinburgh International Book Festival and premiered in The New York Times Theatre at Edinburgh College of Art.

On 6 December 2021 the London Short Film Festival announced a retrospective of Ferguson's short film and music video work, entitled "Irregular Atrocities - The Films of Bryan M. Ferguson", as part of their 2022 festival programme. 

Adult Swim commissioned Ferguson's short film, "Earworm", which was featured in the episode "BUGS" on the channel's long running show, "Off The Air" in September 2022. The film was subsequently selected as Vimeo Staff Pick by the curation team.

On 19 October 2022 it was announced that Ferguson's film "Red Room" would be released theatrically across cinemas nationwide in United Kingdom via the British Film Institute as part of their In Dreams Are Monsters season. The film was classified "15" for strong threat and language by the British Board of Film Classification.

Feature films 
On 25 March 2021 it was announced that Ferguson was in early development on his feature film debut, Funeral Home.

Retrospectives

Filmography

Film

Short films

Music videos 
 "The Island" – Ladytron (2018)
 "Hopeless!!!" – Sega Bodega (2018)
 "Fate" – Boy Harsher (2018)
 "This Broken Design" – The Ninth Wave (2019)
 "Deadzone" – Ladytron (2019)
 "U Suck" – Sega Bodega (2019)
 "So Long!" – Fish Narc (2020)
 "New Medication" – Fish Narc (2020)
 "I'm Only Going To Hurt You" – The Ninth Wave (2020)                              
 "Turn Away" (Live From The Void) – Kontravoid (2020)
 "Make U Stay" – Sega Bodega &  Låpsley (2020)
 "Here Comes Comus!" – Arab Strap (2021)
"Love Divide" - Ross From Friends (2021)
"Fair Game" - Alice Glass (2021)
"Love Is Violence" - Alice Glass (2022)
"Monster" - The Soft Moon (2022)
"Witness to Your Love" - Garbage (2022)
”Hotel Corridors” - Låpsley (2022)

References 

British music video directors
Scottish film directors
1987 births
Living people